Shunga is a large village in the Zaonezhie peninsula by Lake Putkozero in Russia's Republic of Karelia. It is part of Medvezhyegorsky District and is located around 50 km from the district capital, Medvezhyegorsk. The mineraloid Shungite is named after this village as it was first described based on deposits found nearby.

References

Cities and towns in the Republic of Karelia
Medvezhyegorsky District